BK Zeros is a Swedish football club located in Motala.

Background
BK Zeros currently play in Division 6 Östergötland Västra which is the eighth tier of Swedish football. They play their home matches at the Z-parken in Motala.

BK Zeros are affiliated to Östergötlands Fotbollförbund.

Season to season

In their most successful period BK Zeros competed in the following divisions:

In recent seasons BK Zeros have competed in the following divisions:

Footnotes

External links
 BK Zeros – Official website

Football clubs in Östergötland County
Association football clubs established in 1932
1932 establishments in Sweden